Alexander Tschugguel (born 24 June 1993) is an Austrian conservative political and Traditionalist Catholic activist. He has been active in the anti-abortion movement, critical of the international community's focus on climate change, and has campaigned against same-sex marriage in Austria and Germany. Tschugguel is a founding member of The Reform Conservatives, a now-inactive Austrian conservative political party focused on abolishing the European Parliament.

In November 2019 Tschugguel received international attention for stealing statuettes, reportedly of Pachamama, that were on display inside the church of Santa Maria in Traspontina in Rome as part of the Amazon synod, and throwing them off the Ponte Sant'Angelo into the Tiber.

Personal life and family 

Alexander Tschugguel is a descendant of the Barons von Tschugguel zu Tramin, a Tyrolean family that were part of the Austrian nobility. The family, who were originally hereditary knights, were granted the hereditary title of Baron by the House of Hapsburg in 1705. The Barons von Tschugguel were originally Roman Catholic and remained so until Tschugguel's great-grandfather converted to Lutheranism. Alexander's father, Dr. Walter Tschugguel, works as a physician in Vienna.
Alexander Tschugguel was born in Vienna in 1993. He was baptized in a Lutheran ceremony and raised within the Evangelical Church of the Augsburg Confession in Austria. When he was fifteen years old, Tschugguel chose to be received into the Roman Catholic Church. He identifies as a Traditionalist Catholic and exclusively attends the Tridentine Mass, which continues to be said locally in Ecclesiastical Latin by the Priestly Fraternity of Saint Peter and by priests of the Oratory of St. Philip Neri.

Tschugguel was married in 2019 in a wedding celebrated by Bishop Athanasius Schneider, the auxiliary of the Roman Catholic Archdiocese of Mary Most Holy in Astana, Kazakhstan.

Activism and views 

Tschugguel began working for the conservative political organization Tradition, Family and Property when he was sixteen years old. He has worked with conservative politicians Ewald Stadler and Beatrix von Storch, as well as political activist Hedwig von Beverfoerde, to protest and campaign against abortion, same-sex marriage, and the inclusion of gender studies and sex education in schools in Germany and Austria.

Tschugguel opposes immigration reform and allowing Muslim refugees into Austria and Germany. He describes himself as a patriot and a monarchist. He is a spokesperson for the Young European Student Initiative, a non-partisan independent initiative of Christian and conservative university students. In 2013 he helped Ewald Stadler found The Reform Conservatives, an Austrian conservative political party focused on reversing the Maastricht Treaty and abolishing the European Parliament.

In 2014 Tschugguel co-organized a bus tour in Germany with von Beverfoerde to support traditional marriage. In 2018 and 2019, he was the co-organizer of the Vienna March for Life. In May 2019 he organized Rosary for Austria, a Latin Mass and prayer event at the Karlskirche.

On 21 October 2019 Tschugguel and an accomplice stole five statues, reportedly of the Inca fertility goddess Pachamama, from the Church of Santa Maria in Traspontina and threw them from the Ponte Sant'Angelo into the Tiber. The statues were on display as part of the Amazon Synod taking place in the Vatican. He came forward on 4 November 2019 in a YouTube video. Tschugguel, who had removed the statues believing them to be a violation of the First Commandment, received support from various high ranking Church officials after the incident, including Bishop Anthanasius Schneider, Cardinal Raymond Leo Burke, and Cardinal Walter Brandmüller. Tschugguel's actions were criticized by Cardinal Christoph Schönborn, the Archbishop of Vienna, who called the act "scandalous and outrageous." Since coming forward, Tschugguel went on a speaking tour in the United States organized by LifeSite News, the American Society for the Defense of Tradition, Family and Property, and Taylor Marshall.  

Tschugguel founded the St. Boniface Institute in 2019, with the goal of fighting paganism and globalism within the Catholic Church and to "rally those who do not want to bow down to 'Mother Earth'." The institute is named for Saint Boniface who, according to tradition, cut down Donar's Oak and used the wood to build a church. Through the institute, Tschugguel connects different Traditionalist Catholic communities throughout Europe with each other.

In a public address in 2019, Tschugguel criticized the United Nations and the European Union for their focus on climate change, calling it an agenda pushed by "leftist politicians, communist NGOs, and skillfully radicalized young teenagers from Scandinavia." He went on to praise United States president Donald Trump's decision to withdraw from the Paris Agreement, calling the action "true statesmanship", and called into question the Church and other international institutions' focus on the Amazon.

In December 2019 Tschugguel organized a prayer protest outside of St. Stephen's Cathedral in Vienna. The protest was in response to the cathedral hosting the Life Ball, an LGBTQ-friendly annual charity event to raise money for HIV and AIDS awareness. Tschugguel was thanked by retired Archbishop Carlo Maria Viganò for organizing the protest.

On 18 January 2020 Tschugguel protested alongside von Beverfoerde, retired Archbishop Viganò, Roberto de Mattei, and Gabriele Kuby in Munich, asking Pope Francis and the German Bishops' Conference for "clarity and coherence" and to end "dissimulation and deception" in the Catholic Church in Germany. The group organizing the silent prayer protest, acting under the name Acies Ordinata, included 130 members of Catholic laity from Germany, Austria, Italy, Brazil, Chile, Canada, and the United States.

References

External links 
 St. Boniface Institute

Living people
1993 births
21st-century Roman Catholics
Austrian anti-same-sex-marriage activists
Austrian anti-abortion activists
Austrian political activists
Austrian traditionalist Catholics
Austrian monarchists
Austrian nationalists
Catholicism and far-right politics
Converts to Roman Catholicism from Lutheranism
Politicians from Vienna
Roman Catholic activists
Tschugguel family
Conservatism in Austria